The Shady Lady is a 1928 American drama film directed by Edward H. Griffith and starring Phyllis Haver, Robert Armstrong and Louis Wolheim. It was made as a part-talkie during the transition from silent to sound film.

Synopsis
An innocent woman is unjustly mixed-up in a murder case in New York and flees to Havana where she is widely known as the "Shady Lady". In Cuba she becomes mixed up with a gang of gunrunners.

Cast
 Phyllis Haver as Lola Mantell 
 Robert Armstrong as Blake 
 Louis Wolheim as Professor Holbrook 
 Russell Gleason as Haley
 Jim Farley
 Joyzelle Joyner

Critical reception
A review in Harrison's Reports said that the film was a good story, keeping the viewer's interest throughout, with "pretty tense suspense" in its second half. It added, "The manner by which the different threads of the story are interwoven in the closing scenes is intelligent, and satisfies the discriminating spectator." The review praised Haver, Armstrong, and Wolheim for their work.

References

Bibliography
 Quinlan, David. The Illustrated Guide to Film Directors. Batsford, 1983.

External links
 

1928 films
1928 drama films
1920s English-language films
American silent feature films
Silent American drama films
Films directed by Edward H. Griffith
American black-and-white films
Pathé Exchange films
Films set in Havana
1920s American films